The Carolina Challenge Cup is a four-team round robin pre-season competition hosted by the Charleston Battery. It was started in 2004 and features teams from Major League Soccer and the United Soccer Leagues. The 2009 Carolina Challenge Cup was won by Real Salt Lake.

Teams
Four clubs competed in the tournament:

Results
 2009-03-07   D.C. United  Real Salt Lake     0  3
 2009-03-07   Charleston   Toronto FC         1  2
 2009-03-11   D.C. United  Toronto FC         1  2
 2009-03-11   Charleston   Real Salt Lake     1  2
 2009-03-14   Toronto FC   Real Salt Lake     1  2
 2009-03-14   Charleston   D.C. United        0  2

Final standings

See also
Carolina Challenge Cup

External links
 DC United, Toronto FC & Real Salt Lake join Charleston Battery for 2009 Carolina Challenge Cup
 CCC 2009 Matchday 1
 CCC 2009 Matchday 2
 CCC 2009 Matchday 3

2009
2009 in Canadian soccer
Carolina
2009 in sports in South Carolina
March 2009 sports events in the United States